North Sea is a hamlet and census-designated place (CDP) in the Town of Southampton in Suffolk County, on the South Fork of Long Island, in New York, United States. The population was 4,458 at the 2010 census.

It is served by the North Sea Fire District, which operates in adjacent areas as well.

Geography

Demographics

Demographics of the CDP

As of the census of 2000, there were 4,493 people, 1,880 households, and 1,210 families residing in the CDP. The population density was 364.9 per square mile (140.9/km2). There were 3,265 housing units at an average density of 265.2/sq mi (102.4/km2). The racial makeup of the CDP was 94.70% White, 1.40% African American, 0.18% Native American, 0.96% Asian, 0.22% Pacific Islander, 1.65% from other races, and 0.89% from two or more races. Hispanic or Latino of any race were 5.30% of the population.

There were 1,880 households, out of which 26.3% had children under the age of 18 living with them, 52.4% were married couples living together, 8.7% had a female householder with no husband present, and 35.6% were non-families. 28.2% of all households were made up of individuals, and 10.0% had someone living alone who was 65 years of age or older. The average household size was 2.39 and the average family size was 2.92.

In the CDP, the population was spread out, with 20.5% under the age of 18, 5.3% from 18 to 24, 28.4% from 25 to 44, 30.0% from 45 to 64, and 15.8% who were 65 years of age or older. The median age was 43 years. For every 100 females, there were 96.6 males. For every 100 females age 18 and over, there were 94.9 males.

The median income for a household in the CDP was $62,684, and the median income for a family was $71,168. Males had a median income of $53,879 versus $38,219 for females. The per capita income for the CDP was $34,668. About 4.5% of families and 7.2% of the population were below the poverty line, including 11.3% of those under age 18 and 7.7% of those age 65 or over.

References

Southampton (town), New York
Census-designated places in New York (state)
Hamlets in New York (state)
Census-designated places in Suffolk County, New York
Hamlets in Suffolk County, New York
Populated coastal places in New York (state)